The Ministry of Health  is a ministry of the Government of Haiti. This ministry is responsible for country-wide health and is part of the Prime Minister's Cabinet.

See also

References

Government ministries of Haiti